In 2013, since the American singer, songwriter, and actress Ariana Grande has released her debut album Yours Truly, she performed four concert tours, three of which were worldwide. She has also performed at various award shows, music festivals and television programmes.

Debut performances 
Grande promoted her debut album Yours Truly in 2013 and 2014 at the Wango Tango and the 2013 MTV Video Music Awards. Her first concert tour, The Listening Sessions (2013), visited North America and grossed over $679,360. Grande also served as an opening act for Justin Bieber on selected dates of his Believe Tour in 2013 in Florida for 3 nights.

World tours 
Grande's first world tour, The Honeymoon Tour (2015) promoted her second studio album, My Everything. The 88 show tour visited North America, Europe, Asia, and Latin America. The tour grossed $41.8 million, with a total attendance of 808,667.

Grande's Dangerous Woman Tour, from February 2017 to September 2017, visited North America, Europe, Latin America, Asia and Oceania. In December 2017, several media sources reported that the tour had grossed over $71 million. On May 22, 2017, a terrorist attack occurred at Grande's concert at the Manchester Arena in the United Kingdom, now known as the Manchester Arena bombing. In response, Grande performed a benefit concert named One Love Manchester.

On 8 August 2018, Grande announced The Sweetener Sessions, a promotional tour for her fourth studio album, Sweetener (2018). The concert series had three stops in North America and a fourth one in London.  Later that month, Grande announced on Good Morning America that the Sweetener tour was scheduled to begin in February 2019. However, Grande postponed the tour due to severe "illness". In October 2018, Grande announced her fourth concert tour, the Sweetener World Tour, in support of both her fourth studio album, Sweetener (2018), and her upcoming fifth studio album, Thank U, Next (2019). It commenced in March 2019.

Festivals and other headline performances 
In January 2019, it was announced that Grande was a headline act for the Coachella Valley Music and Arts Festival, becoming the youngest artist and the fourth female artist to headline the event. Also, in February and March 2019, it was announced that Grande was a headline act for Manchester Pride and Lollapalooza.

Guest performances 
Since her 2013 debut, Grande has featured in live performances with other artists across a range of genres. In 2014, Grande performed "Bang Bang" alongside Nicki Minaj and Jessie J at the American Music Awards. She performed in a trio of artists at the season finale of Dancing with the Stars (American season 21) performing the soon-to-be hit "Boys Like You" from Who Is Fancy with Meghan Trainor. Grande featured alongside Stevie Wonder on The Voice (American TV series) series finale performing Wonder's single "Faith". In 2020, Grande performed with Lady Gaga in Gaga's hit single Rain on Me at the 2020 MTV Video Music Awards.

Concert tours

Promotional tours

Headlined events

Live performances

Theater and Broadway appearances

References 

Live performances
Ariana Grande